Azar Andami (8 December 1926 – 19 August 1984) was an Iranian physician and bacteriologist noted for her development of a cholera vaccine.

Early life and career 
Born in Rasht, Iran in 1926, she began her career as a teacher for the Ministry of Culture.

Azar Andami was born in 1926 in Saghrisazan neighborhood of Rasht. She was the fourth child and the only daughter of the family. She finished elementary school in Rasht women's primary school with one year of academic leap. After graduating from the ninth year of general education at Forough High School in Rasht, his father, despite being an intellectual, prevented her from continuing her education and sent her to the Rasht Preparatory University. she graduated from Daneshsara in 1946; In 1947, she was hired by the Ministry of Culture and became a teacher. In 1951, while working, she received a natural science diploma with various exams. In 1953, she participated in the entrance exam of the University of Tehran in the field of medicine of this university and graduated as a Doctor of Medicine in 1953. At first, she specialised in gynaecology. She moved to the Pasteur Institute in Tehran and then to Paris to study bacteriology.

Dr. Azar Andami published several scholarly papers and invented a vaccine against cholera, a bacterial disease primarily caused by drinking contaminated water.

Development of EL Tor vaccine 
From1934 to 1967 cholera-like disease (El Tor) spread in Iran and many other countries. El Tor is an acute diarrheal disease caused by the cholera bacterium. The symptoms of the disease originate from a toxin that is infected by germs in the small intestine of people. Therefore, germs are spread through human feces in the environment and contaminate water and food. In those circumstances, the only way was to inject the cholera vaccine before the disease, and at that time the only vaccine preparation center in Iran was the Pasteur Institute in Iran , where all the facilities were provided to the microbiology laboratory, and the center started working with an organ department. And finally, she can make the El Tor vaccine and prevent horrific and painful disasters.

Death and legacy 
She died in Tehran on 19 August 1984 at the age of 57. A crater, named "Andami", on the planet Venus was named in her honour by the International Astronomical Union.

See also 
List of craters on Venus

References 
 Noushin Ahmadi Khorasani, Iranian Women’s Equality Calendar.
 :fa:%D8%A2%D8%B0%D8%B1 %D8%A7%D9%86%D8%AF%D8%A7%D9%85%DB%8C

Iranian bacteriologists
Vaccinologists
Iranian women scientists
Iranian women physicians
1926 births
1984 deaths
20th-century Iranian physicians
Iranian expatriates in France